Bachy is a surname. Notable people with the surname include: 

François Bachy (born 1960), French television journalist
Jean-Paul Bachy (born 1947), French politician

See also
Bochy